The Aborigines Protection Act may refer to:
 Half-Caste Act 1886 (title in Victoria), or Aborigines Protection Act 1886 (title in Western Australia)
 Aborigines Protection Act 1909 (NSW)